Aneflomorpha citrana is a species of beetle in the family Cerambycidae. It was described by Chemsak in 1960.

References

Aneflomorpha
Beetles described in 1960